Argyrotaenia tucumana is a species of moth of the family Tortricidae. It is found in Tucumán Province, Argentina.

The length of the forewings is 5.1-7.1 mm for males and about 8 mm for females. The ground colour of the forewings is pale tan. The hindwings are pale cream grey, tinged with grey in the apical area. Adults have been recorded on wing in February.

Etymology
The species name refers to the type locality, Tucumán Province.

References

T
Endemic fauna of Argentina
Moths of South America
Moths described in 2004